Wonotoro is a village in Sukapura District, Probolinggo Regency in East Java Province. Its population is 728.

Climate
Wonotoro has a subtropical highland climate (Cwb). It has moderate to little rainfall from May to October and heavy to very heavy rainfall from November to April.

References

Villages in Indonesia